Rema Khristoforovna Svetlova was an Armenian Politician. 

She was appointed Deputy Premier Minister in 1975.

References

20th-century Armenian women politicians
Women government ministers of Armenia